Le Boéchet railway station is a railway station in the municipality of Les Bois, in the Swiss canton of Jura. It is located on the  La Chaux-de-Fonds–Glovelier line of the Chemins de fer du Jura.

Services 
 the following services stop at Le Boéchet:

References

External links 
 
 

Railway stations in the canton of Jura
Chemins de fer du Jura stations